The Roland VariOS is a production environment with audio editing and sample playback, released by Roland Corporation in 2003. It is based on the technology from the VP-9000 VariPhrase processor, and features the ability to mount two expansion cards.

Overview 
The Roland VariOS is a rack-mounted open-ended variable system module. It is possible to independently manipulate the pitch, time and formant of a sample, add effects and build complete audio-based arrangements—all in a real-time environment and without CPU drain. In addition, the VariOS can emulate analogue synthesisers such as the Roland Jupiter 8 and Roland TB-303.

The VariOS can operate as a stand-alone tool or alongside digital audio sequencers using MIDI clock and MTC sync. V-Producer arrangements can be saved as a Standard MIDI File, and processed audio files can be exported in WAV or AIFF format for use in other editors and software.

Expansion cards 
Two expansion cards were released for the VariOS. The VC-1 emulates a Roland D-50, while the VC-2 can allow vocal processing with an external microphone, with effects such as a vocoder and choir. Roland has not announced plans to release any future expansion cards. Furthermore, it appears the VC-2 is now out of production, with various sources claiming that Roland made a set number of cards in an "estimation" of demand.

References

External links 
 Official Site: VariOS (ROLAND)

VariOS